Flowering moss is a common name for several plants and may refer to:

 Phlox stolonifera, native to the United States
 Phlox subulata, native to the United States
 Portulaca grandiflora, native to South America
 Pyxidanthera barbulata, native to the United States